Samuel Fleming Barr (June 15, 1829May 29, 1919) was a Republican member of the U.S. House of Representatives from Pennsylvania.

Samuel F. Barr was born near Coleraine, County Londonderry on the island of Ireland (the entirety of which was then part of the U.K.).  He immigrated to the United States in 1831 with his parents, who settled in Harrisburg, Pennsylvania.  He attended the common schools, and worked as a freight agent of the Pittsburgh, Fort Wayne & Chicago Railroad in 1855 and 1856.  Early in the United States Civil War was employed upon government railways in and about Washington, D.C.  He worked as editor of the Harrisburg Telegraph from 1873 to 1878.

Barr was elected as a Republican to the Forty-seventh and Forty-eighth Congresses.  He declined to be a candidate for renomination in 1884.  He retired, spending winters in San Diego, California, and summers in Seal Harbor, Maine.  He died in San Diego in 1919.  Interment in Odd Fellows Cemetery.

Sources

The Political Graveyard

1829 births
1919 deaths
Irish emigrants to the United States (before 1923)
Politicians from Harrisburg, Pennsylvania
People from Mount Desert Island
Republican Party members of the United States House of Representatives from Pennsylvania
People from Coleraine, County Londonderry
19th-century American politicians